Kriek lambic is a cherry-infused lambic beer.

Kriek may also refer to:

People
 Emile Kriek (born 1989), South African cricketer
 Erik Kriek (born 1966), Dutch artist
 Johan Kriek (born 1958), South African-American tennis player
 Marjolein Kriek (born 1973), Dutch clinical geneticist

Afrikaans-language surnames
Dutch-language surnames